Erin Mielzynski (born 25 May 1990) is a Canadian former World Cup alpine ski racer.  She primarily competed in technical events and specialized in slalom.

Born in Brampton, Ontario, Mielzynski made her World Cup debut in November 2009 and has competed in three Winter Olympics and five World Championships.

She won her first World Cup race in March 2012 in slalom at Ofterschwang, Germany, her first top-ten finish. It was the first World Cup victory for a Canadian woman in over four years, when Emily Brydon won a Super G in February 2008 at St. Moritz, Switzerland. It was also the first World Cup win in slalom for a Canadian woman in over 41 years; Betsy Clifford won at Schruns, Austria in January 1971.

In January 2022, Mielzynski was named to Canada's 2022 Olympic team.

World Cup results

Season standings

Top ten finishes
 1 win – (1 SL)
 2 podiums – (2 SL); 19 top tens

World Championship results

Olympic results

References

External links

 

 
 
 
 Erin Mielzynski at Alpine Canada
 

1990 births
Living people
Olympic alpine skiers of Canada
Sportspeople from Brampton
Alpine skiers at the 2010 Winter Olympics
Alpine skiers at the 2014 Winter Olympics
Alpine skiers at the 2018 Winter Olympics
Alpine skiers at the 2022 Winter Olympics
Canadian female alpine skiers
Sportspeople from Ontario